The Frederick A. E. Meyer House is a historic house located at 929 East 200 South in Salt Lake City, Utah.

Description and history 
It is an Italianate style house that was built in 1873. Its NRHP nomination in 1983 asserted that the house was "one of the best examples of the Italianate architectural style in Utah architecture, and... the best example of the two story box type." It is one of only two wood-frame examples of the type in Salt Lake City, the other being the NRHP-listed Jonathan C. and Eliza K. Royle House.

It is listed on the National Register of Historic Places, listed as of July 7, 1983.

References

External links

Houses on the National Register of Historic Places in Utah
Italianate architecture in Utah
Houses completed in 1873
Houses in Salt Lake City
Historic American Buildings Survey in Utah
National Register of Historic Places in Salt Lake City